Anna apple is a dual purpose cultivar of domesticated apple that is very early ripening and does well in warm climates.

History
Anna was bred by Abba Stein at the Ein Shemer kibbutz in Israel, in order to achieve a Golden Delicious-like apple, that can be cultivated in nearly tropical areas. A regular apple needs between 500 - 1000 hours of chilling (aka chill units) in order to get in blossom, but Anna flourishes even with less than 300 hours, so it can be grown in warm climates. It is recommended for USDA hardiness zones 5–9, or rather 6–9.

Anna was introduced to the United States in 1959, and is the most popular apple cultivar in Florida.

Description

Anna's skin color is very much like its Golden Delicious parentage, red flushed (by fifty percent) over green or greenish-yellow. It is excellent for fresh eating and keeps shape during cooking. It is self-sterile, and usually cultivated side by side with the Dorsett Golden cultivar or by Ein Shemer, all of which can be grown in warm climates and provide cross pollination for each other.

Anna flowers and harvests at a very early season, gives a heavy crop, and keeps fresh 2–3 weeks.

See also
Agriculture in Israel
Agricultural research in Israel

References

Apple cultivars